Tablederry is a former rural locality in the Barcaldine Region, Queensland, Australia.

On 22 November 2019 the Queensland Government decided to amalgamate the localities in the Barcaldine Region, resulting in five expanded localities based on the larger towns: Alpha, Aramac, Barcaldine, Jericho and Muttaburra. Tablederry was incorporated into Muttaburra.

Geography 
The Hughenden Muttaburra Road passes through the locality from the north to the south-east. The Cramsie Muttaburra Road passes through the locality from the south-west to the south.

The Bangall, Landsborough and Towerhill Creeks flow through the locality towards Muttaburra.

The predominant land use is grazing cattle on native vegetation.

Economy 
In 2017, the 4832 postcode (which includes Tablederry) was one of the lowest 10 postcodes by income level in Australia, with an average income of $21,415.

Education 
The nearest primary school is in Muttaburra. The nearest secondary school is in Aramac but only provides education up to Year 10. The nearest secondary schools that offers education through to Year 12 are in Barcaldine, Longreach and Winton.

References 

Barcaldine Region
Unbounded localities in Queensland